Upper Tyrone Township is a township in Fayette County, Pennsylvania, United States. The population was 1,768 at the 2020 census. It is served by the Southmoreland School District.

Communities in the township include Keifertown, King View, Owensdale, McClure, Dry Hill, Walnut Hill, and part of Prittstown.

It is named after County Tyrone, Northern Ireland.

Geography
The township is on the northern edge of Fayette County, bordered to the north by Westmoreland County. Jacobs Creek forms the northern border of the township and the county line. The borough of Everson, a separate municipality, lies along the south side of Jacobs Creek next to the township.

Demographics

As of the census of 2000, there were 2,244 people, 870 households, and 664 families residing in the township.  The population density was 288.4 people per square mile (111.4/km).  There were 902 housing units at an average density of 115.9/sq mi (44.8/km).  The racial makeup of the township was 98.62% White, 0.80% African American, 0.04% Native American, 0.04% Asian, 0.04% Pacific Islander, and 0.45% from two or more races. Hispanic or Latino of any race were 0.49% of the population.

There were 870 households, out of which 31.3% had children under the age of 18 living with them, 61.1% were married couples living together, 10.2% had a female householder with no husband present, and 23.6% were non-families. 21.4% of all households were made up of individuals, and 10.3% had someone living alone who was 65 years of age or older.  The average household size was 2.58 and the average family size was 2.97.

In the township the population was spread out, with 22.8% under the age of 18, 7.8% from 18 to 24, 29.6% from 25 to 44, 24.1% from 45 to 64, and 15.7% who were 65 years of age or older.  The median age was 38 years. For every 100 females, there were 99.5 males.  For every 100 females age 18 and over, there were 100.1 males.

The median income for a household in the township was $28,106, and the median income for a family was $32,050. Males had a median income of $26,146 versus $20,069 for females. The per capita income for the township was $13,439.  About 9.8% of families and 10.0% of the population were below the poverty line, including 10.2% of those under age 18 and 14.2% of those age 65 or over.

References

External links
Upper Tyrone Township official website

Pittsburgh metropolitan area
Townships in Fayette County, Pennsylvania
Townships in Pennsylvania